Maude G. Charron (born 28 April 1993) is a Canadian weightlifter, who competes in the 63/64 kg category and represents Canada at international competitions. She is an Olympic and Commonwealth Games champion in the women's 64 kg division. Charron also owns the clean & jerk Commonwealth Games record, the snatch and total Canadian weightlifting records, all the Panamerican records in her weight class.

Career
Charron won the silver medal in the snatch at the 2017 World Weightlifting Championships.

She continued her international weightlifting at the 2018 Commonwealth Games in Australia. There she lifted a Commonwealth Games record when she lifted  in the clean and jerk on the way to the gold medal. This record beat compatriot Christine Girard's record from the 2006 Commonwealth Games by 1 kg.

In her buildup to the 2020 Summer Olympics Charron competed at the 2020 Pan American Weightlifting Championships which were held in 2021 as a result of the Covid-19 pandemic. She had a very successful competition in Santo Domingo on her way to gold setting personal bests and a Panamerican Record in all of the snatch, clean & jerk, and total lifted categories. Charron won the gold medal in 64 kg division at the 2020 Summer Olympics in Tokyo with a 105 kg snatch and 131 kg clean and jerk, for a total of 236 kg. Following her victory she dedicated her gold medal win to fellow Canadian Olympic champion Christine Girard, who had only received her gold six years after the 2012 Summer Olympics after the other two athletes in front of her were disqualified.

Charron joined the Canadian team for the 2022 Commonwealth Games in Birmingham, and was named as co-flagbearer for the opening ceremony alongside wheelchair racer Josh Cassidy. She noted her excitement at her family being able to attend, which had not been the case at the Olympics due to the pandemic. Charron mounted a successful title defence in Birmingham.

In December 2022, she won the bronze medal in the women's 59kg event at the World Weightlifting Championships held in Bogotá, Colombia. In that same month, she was also elected as member of the IWF Athletes' Commission.

References

1993 births
Living people
French Quebecers
Canadian female weightlifters
Sportspeople from Quebec
People from Rimouski
World Weightlifting Championships medalists
Weightlifters at the 2018 Commonwealth Games
Weightlifters at the 2022 Commonwealth Games
Commonwealth Games medallists in weightlifting
Commonwealth Games gold medallists for Canada
Weightlifters at the 2019 Pan American Games
Pan American Games competitors for Canada
Pan American Weightlifting Championships medalists
Weightlifters at the 2020 Summer Olympics
Olympic medalists in weightlifting
Olympic gold medalists for Canada
Medalists at the 2020 Summer Olympics
Olympic weightlifters of Canada
21st-century Canadian women
Medallists at the 2018 Commonwealth Games
Medallists at the 2022 Commonwealth Games